The Xalbal River is a river of Guatemala. 
Its sources are in the Sierra de los Cuchumatanes (at ) in the department of El Quiché, where the river is called Río Xaclbal or Río Chajul. The Xaclbal river flows northwards down the tropical lowlands of Ixcan where it is called Río Xalbal (at ), and crosses the border with Mexico, where it joins the Lacantún River, a tributary of the Usumacinta river.

The village of Xalbal, named after the river, suffered a massacre in 1982. The village was abandoned in March 1982.

References

External links
Map of Guatemala including the river

Rivers of Guatemala
Geography of Mesoamerica
International rivers of North America